Ralph Marshall (May 17, 1894 – November 7, 1981) was an American sports shooter. He competed in the 50 m pistol event at the 1936 Summer Olympics.

References

1894 births
1981 deaths
Romanian male sport shooters
Olympic shooters of Romania
Shooters at the 1936 Summer Olympics
Sportspeople from Lima, Ohio
People from Harrod, Ohio